This is the list of cathedrals in Syria sorted by denomination.

Eastern Orthodox
Eastern Orthodox cathedrals in Syria:
 Mariamite Cathedral in Damascus (Antiochian Eastern-Orthodox)
 Cathedral of Elijah the Prophet in Aleppo (Greek Orthodox)
 Forty Martyrs Cathedral in Homs
 St. George's Cathedral in Latakia
 St. George's Cathedral in Hama

Oriental Orthodox
Oriental Orthodox cathedrals in Syria:
 Cathedral of Saint Ephrem the Syrian in Aleppo (Syriac Orthodox)
 Forty Martyrs Cathedral in Aleppo (Armenian Apostolic)
 Saint Mary of the Holy Belt (Um Al Zennar) Syriac Orthodox Cathedral in Homs (Syriac Orthodox)
 Cathedral of Saint George in Damascus (Syriac Orthodox)

Roman Catholic
Cathedrals of the Roman Catholic Church in Syria:
 Cathedral of St. Francis of Assisi in Aleppo (Latin Rite)
 St. Elias Maronite Cathedral in Aleppo (Maronite Rite)
 Cathedral of Our Lady of the Assumption in Aleppo (Syriac Catholic)
 Cathedral Our Lady of Pity in Aleppo (Armenian Catholic)
 St. Joseph's Cathedral in Aleppo (Chaldean Catholic)
 Greek-Melkite Cathedral of the Virgin Mary in Aleppo (Melkite Greek)
 Greek-Melkite Patriarchal Cathedral of the Dormition of Our Lady, Damascus in Damascus (Melkite Greek)
 Cathedral of Our Lady of Dormition in Khabab (Melkite Greek)
 Maronite Cathedral in Damascus (Maronite Rite)
 Syriac Catholic Cathedral of Saint Paul in Damascus (Syriac Catholic)
 Church of the Queen of the Universe in Damascus (Armenian Catholic)
Cathedral of the Holy Spirit in Homs (Syriac Catholic)
Greek-Melkite Cathedral of Our Lady of Peace in Homs (Melkite Greek)
 Cathedral of Our Lady of Latakia in Latakia (Maronite Rite)
Cathedral of Our Lady of the Annunciation in Latakia (Melkite Greek)

See also

List of cathedrals
Christianity in Syria

References

Cathedrals in Syria
Syria
Cathedrals
Cathedrals